Widtsoe is a surname. Notable people with the surname include:

John A. Widtsoe (1872–1952), Mormon official
Leah D. Widtsoe (1874–1965), Mormon official, wife of John
Osborne J. P. Widtsoe (1877–1920), Mormon official and English professor